George A. Romero (1940–2017) was an American-Canadian film director, writer, editor and cinematographer. He contributed to many projects as either the writer, director, editor, cinematographer or a combination of the four.

Romero's first project was the 1968 horror film Night of the Living Dead, which he produced independently.  Romero was also a contributing producer for the anthology television series Tales from the Darkside, which aired from 1983 to 1988.

Film

Short films

Television

Acting roles

Documentary appearances
 Document of the Dead (1985)
 Drive-In Madness (1987)
 The American Nightmare (2000)
 Midnight Movies: From the Margin to the Mainstream (2005)
 Dead On: The Life and Cinema of George A. Romero (2008)
 Nightmares in Red, White and Blue (2009)

Notes

References

External links

Director filmographies

sr:Џорџ Ромеро